Giannis Kanakis (27 August 1927 — 24 March 2016) was a Greek former professional footballer who played as a wide midfielder.

Club career

Early years
Kanakis started football at Elpida Kavalas and continued at AE Kavalas, competing in the defensive line. In 1949 he was transferred to AEK Athens following the suggestion of Kostas Negrepontis.

AEK Athens
At AEK, he was relocated in the position of the wide midfielder. A strong, spirited, passionate, but also skilled football player, with a great shot, he wrote his own history in AEK and in Greek football and was loved very much by the fans of the yellowblacks. In 1952, after Kleanthis Maropoulos retired, he became the team's captain. He was one of the team's leading players in the first half of the 1950's and with the arrival of the legendary striker, Kostas Nestoridis in 1955, they formed an amazing competitive partnership. On 24 June 1956, he won the Cup with AEK, scoring the  winner with a power shot in the final 2–1 against Olympiacos. On 25 October 1959, he scored in the 3rd minute in the away match against Ethnikos Piraeus and became the first player in the history of Greek football who scored in the newly formed first national division. He managed to compete in 6 times in that season's championship scoring 2 goals. In the second round match against Ethnikos Piraeus at the Nea Filadelfeia Stadium, he was honored for his presence, before retiring as a footballer, passing on the captainancy of the team to Andreas Stamatiadis. With AEK he won 2 Cups and a Athens FCA League in 1950.

International career
Kanakis played for Greece once, in the away friendly 1–0 defeat against France B in Marseille on 14 October 1951.

He was also anointed an international with the Military team, scoring 10 goals, winning the World Military Cup in 1952 and scoring the winner against Belgium.

Personal life
Kanakis he worked at the PPC alongside his football career. After his retirement as a footballer he remained close to his beloved AEK and even served for a number of years as director of their football department. He died on 24 March 2016 at the age of 88.

Honours

AEK Athens
Greek Cup: 1949–50, 1955–56
Athens FCA League: 1950

Greece military
World Military Cup: 1952

References

External links
"History of AEK", collective work, Publications G.Ch. Alexandris, Athens 1996
"Greece, March Through Time", V. Melecoglou-Agg. Mendrinos-Th. Davelos, "Papazisis Publications", Athens 2001
Giannis Kanakis at aekfc.gr

1927 births
2016 deaths
Footballers from Kavala
Greece international footballers
Association football midfielders
AEK Athens F.C. players
Super League Greece players
Greek footballers